Osasco is a comune (municipality) in the Metropolitan City of Turin in the Italian region Piedmont, located about  southwest of Turin.

Osasco borders the following municipalities: Pinerolo, San Secondo di Pinerolo, Bricherasio, and Garzigliana.

Twin towns
 Osasco, Brazil

References

External links
 Official website

Cities and towns in Piedmont